Uchte is a Samtgemeinde ("collective municipality") in the district of Nienburg, in Lower Saxony, Germany. Its seat is in the village Uchte.

The Samtgemeinde Uchte consists of the following municipalities:
 Diepenau
 Raddestorf 
 Uchte
 Warmsen

Samtgemeinden in Lower Saxony